Curse of the Hidden Mirror is the fourteenth studio album by American hard rock band Blue Öyster Cult, released in June 5, 2001. The only single from the record was the poorly received "Pocket". Lackluster sales and poor relations led to the band being dropped by their label, Sanctuary Records; as a result, BÖC did not release another studio album for nearly 20 years, until the release of The Symbol Remains in 2020.
  
The title of the album is taken from a song contained in the unreleased album by the Stalk-Forrest Group, the band that would later become Blue Öyster Cult, recorded in 1970.

John Shirley, an author of cyberpunk science fiction, wrote the lyrics for many songs of the album.

The song "Out of the Darkness" was originally featured in the 1992 film Bad Channels, which Blue Öyster Cult recorded the soundtrack for, although the song was not included in the soundtrack album for the movie. "Showtime" was originally written and recorded for Cultösaurus Erectus but did not make the final cut.

Curse of the Hidden Mirror is the final Blue Öyster Cult album to feature longtime keyboardist Allen Lanier, who died in 2013.

Track listing

Personnel

Band members
Eric Bloom – vocals (2, 3, 5, 6, 8, 10, 11), stun guitars, associate producer
Donald 'Buck Dharma' Roeser – lead guitars, vocals (1, 4, 7, 9), producer
Allen Lanier – rhythm guitars, keyboards, background vocals 
Danny Miranda – bass, background vocals
Bobby Rondinelli – drums, percussion

Additional musicians
Norman DelTufo – percussion
George Cintron – background vocals

Production
Paul Orofino – engineer, mixing
Leon Zervos – mastering

References

Blue Öyster Cult albums
2001 albums
Sanctuary Records albums
CMC International albums